The twenty-sixth season of British science fiction television series Doctor Who began on 9 September 1989 with the serial Battlefield, after a regular series of four serials was broadcast finishing with Survival which was the final episode of Doctor Who to air before a 16-year absence from episodic television following its cancellation. John Nathan-Turner produced the series, with Andrew Cartmel script editing.

Casting

Main cast 
 Sylvester McCoy as the Seventh Doctor
 Sophie Aldred as Ace

Sylvester McCoy and Sophie Aldred both continue their roles as the Seventh Doctor and Ace for their final season.

Recurring stars 
 Nicholas Courtney as Brigadier Lethbridge-Stewart
 Anthony Ainley as the Master

Nicholas Courtney returned to play Brigadier Lethbridge-Stewart in Battlefield. He first appeared with the Second Doctor in 1968 in The Web of Fear before becoming a recurring character throughout the Second Doctor to the Fifth Doctor and last appearing in The Five Doctors (1983).

Anthony Ainley returned to play The Master in Survival, having last appeared in The Trial of a Time Lord (1986). This was Ainley's final television appearance in the role, though he portrayed the Master one last time in the 1997 computer game Destiny of the Doctors.

Guest stars 
Jean Marsh, who had portrayed Sara Kingdom in The Daleks' Master Plan (1965–66), also appeared in Battlefield playing the part of the main antagonist.

Serials 

Continuing on from Season 25, Season 26 continued script editor Andrew Cartmel's move to push the series towards a darker approach, focusing this time more on Ace's personal life as well as The Doctor's past and manipulations. This season was broadcast on Wednesdays.

Broadcast
The entire season was broadcast from 6 September to 6 December 1989. The Curse of Fenric was originally intended to be aired before Ghost Light, but was subsequently rescheduled.

Home media

VHS releases

DVD and Blu-ray releases

In print

Season 27
Initial planning work had begun on Season 27, intended for the end of 1990, in mid-1989 with Andrew Cartmel and a group of regular writers, including Ben Aaronovitch, Ian Briggs and Marc Platt, discussing potential story ideas. One of the major intentions was to have been the departure of Ace halfway through, which would have seen the character taken to Gallifrey to become a Time Lord. This would also have seen the subsequent introduction of a new companion, planned as an "aristocratic cat burglar". The cancellation of the series meant that no detailed work was undertaken beyond these initial ideas:
Bad Destination by Ben Aaronovitch: Intended to feature a new monster called the "Metatraxi", a race of samurai-like insect warriors, this was planned as a story concerning the politics of humanitarian aid. The only significant detail was the idea of the opening, which would have featured Ace as the captain of a starship. 
Thin Ice by Marc Platt: Planned as the serial that would see the departure of Ace, this was to see the return of the Ice Warriors and be set in London in 1968. 
Action At A Distance by Andrew Cartmel: Planned as the introduction of the new companion, who would have come across the Doctor in the midst of robbing a country house. 
Alixion, by Robin Mukherjee: It would have featured the Doctor playing a series of deadly games on an asteroid, and would have likely led to the Seventh Doctor's regeneration and Sylvester McCoy's departure.
Blood And Iron, by Andrew Cartmel: was being considered for the final serial as well. 

Four of the five proposed serials were subsequently adapted by the authors alongside Big Finish Productions into audio adventures that were released as part of their Doctor Who: The Lost Stories range in 2011:
Bad Destination was released as Earth Aid
Thin Ice was released under its own title
Action at a Distance became Crime of the Century
Blood and Iron was released as Animal

The only one of the proposed stories that did not receive a release from Big Finish was Alixion.

Although the first series of Doctor Whos return in 2005 is the 27th full series of the show, the production team officially restarted the series numbering from scratch. This was mainly due to the 16-year gap between Season 26 and the new series (not counting the 1996 television movie).

References

Bibliography

 

1989 British television seasons
Season 26
Season 26
26